Ritchie Petty (born June 20, 1968) is an American stock car racing driver. Son of Maurice Petty and nephew of Richard Petty, he competed in the NASCAR Cup Series in the No. 53 Ford owned by his father. His best career Cup finish was a 25th at Talladega.

Motorsports career results

NASCAR
(key) (Bold - Pole position awarded by qualifying time. Italics - Pole position earned by points standings or practice time. * – Most laps led.)

Winston Cup Series

Daytona 500 results

Craftsman Truck Series

References

External links
 
 Driver DB Profile

Living people
1968 births
People from Randleman, North Carolina
Racing drivers from North Carolina
NASCAR drivers
ARCA Menards Series drivers
Petty family
Kyle Petty
Richard Petty